A sestain is a six line poem or repetitive unit of a poem of this format (musaddas), comparable to quatrain (Ruba'i in Persian and Arabic) which is a four line poem or a unit of a poem. There are many types of sestain with different rhyme schemes, for example AABBCC, ABABCC, AABCCB or AAABAB. The sestain is probably next in popularity to the quatrain in European literature. Usually there are three rhymes in the six-line strophe, but sometimes there are only two.

AABBCC

The AABBCC is the simplest rhyme-scheme of the sestain. It was very popular in Old Polish poetry.

ABABCC

The ABABCC rhyme-scheme is one of the most important forms in European poetry. It can be found in Thomas Campion's and Emma Lazarus's poetry. Juliusz Słowacki wrote his poem A Voyage to the Holy Land from Naples with the  famous The Tomb of Agamemnon in ABABCC stanzas.

ABCCBA

It was probably borrowed from the Italian sonnet rhymed sometimes ABBAABBA CDEEDC.

ABBAAB

ABABAB

AABCCB

This rhyme scheme was extremely popular in French poetry. It was used by Victor Hugo and Charles Leconte de Lisle. In English it is called the tail-rhyme stanza. Bob Dylan uses it in several songs, including the A-strains of You're Gonna Make Me Lonesome When You Go and the B-strains of Key West (Philosopher Pirate).

AAABAB

It is Burns's stanza.

ABCABC

References

Stanzaic form